Przędzel-Kolonia  is a village in the administrative district of Gmina Rudnik nad Sanem, within Nisko County, Podkarpackie Voivodeship, in south-eastern Poland.

The village has a population of 325.

References

Villages in Nisko County